opened in Tawaramoto, Nara Prefecture, Japan, in 2004.

See also
 Nara National Museum
 List of Historic Sites of Japan (Nara)
 List of Cultural Properties of Japan - historical materials (Nara)
 List of Cultural Properties of Japan - archaeological materials (Nara)

References

External links
  Karako-Kagi Archaeological Museum

Museums in Nara Prefecture
Archaeological museums in Japan
Tawaramoto, Nara
Museums established in 2004
2004 establishments in Japan